Andrew MacDonald (born September 7, 1986) is a Canadian professional ice hockey defenceman who is currently an unrestricted free agent. He most recently played with SC Bern in the National League (NL). He has previously played in the National Hockey League (NHL) for the New York Islanders and the Philadelphia Flyers, serving as an alternate captain for both franchises.

Playing career

Professional

New York Islanders
MacDonald was drafted in the sixth round, 160th overall, by the New York Islanders in the 2006 NHL Entry Draft. He played junior hockey for the Moncton Wildcats of the Quebec Major Junior Hockey League where he was, along with Keith Yandle, a star defenceman on the team's 2005–06 championship team. He has also played for the Bridgeport Sound Tigers, the Islander's AHL affiliate.

In the 2009–10 season, MacDonald scored his first NHL goal on December 17, 2009, in a 5-2 loss to the New York Rangers. On February 25, 2010, MacDonald was re-signed by the Islanders to a four-year contract extension.

Philadelphia Flyers
During the final year of his contract in the 2013–14 season, MacDonald was traded by the Islanders to the Philadelphia Flyers in exchange for minor leaguer Matt Mangene, a second round pick in the 2015 NHL Entry Draft, and a third-round pick in the 2014 NHL Entry Draft on March 4, 2014. The Flyers signed MacDonald to a six-year, $30 million contract extension on April 15. On October 5, 2015, the Flyers put MacDonald on waivers. On October 6, 2015, MacDonald cleared waivers and was assigned to the Flyers' AHL affiliate team, the Lehigh Valley Phantoms.

Prior to the 2017–18 season, on October 3, 2017, the Flyers named MacDonald an alternate captain.

During the 2018–19 season, MacDonald appeared in 47 games, producing just 9 assists, as the Flyers missed the playoffs.

On June 15, 2019, the Flyers placed MacDonald on unconditional waivers for the purpose of terminating his contract. He was entering the final year of his six-year contract he signed in 2014. The move allowed him to become an unrestricted free agent on July 1.

Europe
As a free agent, MacDonald went un-signed over the following summer before agreeing to an invitation to attend the Calgary Flames 2019 training camp on a professional tryout contract. MacDonald remained with the Flames through camp and pre-season before he was released from his tryout on October 4, 2019. 

With the 2019–20 season underway, MacDonald opted seek a contract abroad for the first time since his stint during the 2012 Lockout in the Czech Republic. On October 21, 2019, MacDonald agreed to a one-year contract for the remainder of the campaign with Swiss club, SC Bern of the National League. He made 15 appearances with Bern, unable to help the club qualify for the post-season. On March 3, 2020, MacDonald left the club at his own request and against the express will of SC Bern prior to their relegation series playoffs.

Career statistics

Regular season and playoffs

References

External links

 

1986 births
Living people
HC Baník Sokolov players
SC Bern players
Bridgeport Sound Tigers players
Canadian ice hockey defencemen
Canadian people of Scottish descent
Ice hockey people from Nova Scotia
HC Karlovy Vary players
Lehigh Valley Phantoms players
Maritime Junior Hockey League players
Moncton Wildcats players
New York Islanders draft picks
New York Islanders players
People from Inverness County, Nova Scotia
Philadelphia Flyers players
Utah Grizzlies (ECHL) players
Canadian expatriate ice hockey players in the United States
Canadian expatriate ice hockey players in the Czech Republic
Canadian expatriate ice hockey players in Switzerland